María Pilar León Cebrián (born 13 June 1995), known as Mapi León, is a Spanish professional footballer who plays as a defender for Liga F club Barcelona and the Spain national team.

León began her career with her hometown club of Prainsa Zaragoza before moving on to Espanyol and Atlético Madrid. At Atlético, she made the transition from a left-back to a center-back under the guidance of coach Ángel Villacampa. León won the first league and Copa de la Reina titles of her career at the club.

In 2017, León was the first paid transfer in Spanish women's football history when she signed for Barcelona from Atlético Madrid, with a fee of 50,000 euros. Domestically with Barcelona, she has won four Copas de la Reina, three league titles, and two Supercopa Femenina. On the continental stage, she has played in three Champions League finals with the club in 2019, 2021 and 2022, winning the 2021 version as part of the first continental treble in the club's history.

León plays internationally with the Spanish national team, making her debut in 2016, in qualifiers for the 2017 UEFA Women's Euro. Since then she has featured in three major international competitions for La Roja in UEFA Women's Euro 2017,  2019 FIFA Women's World Cup and UEFA Women's Euro 2022.

Early life
María Pilar León Cebrián was born 13 June 1995, to parents Javier and Pilar. León was raised with an older brother in La Almozara, a district of Zaragoza.

León started playing volleyball at age seven, and played many other sports as a child including baseball. Later she started playing futsal for local team Gran Vía, where she played as a winger. Around this age, she was granted a scholarship to go to an art school, but turned down the award to focus on football.

León was discovered by David Magaña, a former Zaragoza CFF sporting director, who noticed her and her brother Javi playing football while shopping in a Carrefour supermarket. She began training with the club at age 11.

Club career

Prainsa Zaragoza (2011–2013)
After developing with their B team for two years, León debuted in the Primera División with Prainsa Zaragoza when she was 16. Her match debut with Zaragoza was against Barcelona.

In 2013, Zaragoza made it to the final of the Copa de la Reina, where they faced León's future club FC Barcelona. In her last ever match with the club, León started the final as Zaragoza lost 4–0 to Barcelona, who completed their first domestic double.

Espanyol (2013–2014)
At 18, León joined RCD Espanyol in 2013, where she remained for only one season. Around this time, she began getting call-ups with the senior national team. In addition, she attracted the attention of Atlético Madrid, who finished 3rd in the league in the 2012–13 league season.

Atlético Madrid (2014–2017)
In 2014, León joined Atlético Madrid. In her first season at the club, Atlético finished in second place in the league behind Barcelona, prompting both Atlético and León's debut in the UEFA Women's Champions League. In 2015, León debuted in the UWCL against Russian side Zorky Krasnogorsk, where they were defeated 2–0 in the first leg. Atlético later came back 3–0 to win the tie, but were defeated in the Round of 16 by Lyon on a 9–1 aggregate score.

Within her time at Atlético, León switched from playing as a left-back to playing as a centre-back under the influence of former left-back and Atlético head coach Ángel Villacampa. León won the first league title of her career in the 2016–17 season, when Atlético defeated Real Sociedad on the final matchday of the season. Her performances throughout the season earned her a place in the league's best XI of the season, as well as putting her on FC Barcelona's radar.

During the summer transfer window of 2017, Barcelona and Atlético Madrid underwent a two-month-long transfer saga in their negotiations for León. Prior to her transfer to Barcelona, she trained away from the group, and later fell ill during contract negotiations. In her episode of Barcelona's documentary series Dare to Play, Leon recounts how Atlético interpreted this as her faking an illness in an attempt to force through a move to Barcelona.

Barcelona (2017–present)
On 24 August 2017, León's transfer to Barcelona was made official, the club's sixth signing ahead of the 2017–18 season. With a year remaining on her contract with Atlético Madrid, León signed for a fee of €50,000, becoming the first paid transfer in the history of Spanish women's football.

In her first season at the club, she won the 2018 Copa de la Reina, her first title with Barcelona. León kept a clean sheet for 120 minutes against her former club Atlético Madrid, as they won the match after a goal late in extra time.

In October 2018, León scored her first ever Champions League goal in the Round of 16 against Glasgow City. In 2019, León played the first Champions League Final of her career against Lyon, where Barcelona conceded four goals within the first 30 minutes of the match, and ultimately lost 1–4 against the European giants. Following the conclusion of the Champions League, León renewed her contract with Barcelona for three more years until 2022.

In 2020, León was named as a candidate for UEFA Women's Team of the Year for the first time in her career.

On 6 January 2021, León started the first competitive match at the Camp Nou played by women's teams. She assisted Barcelona's fifth and final goal, when one of her shots was deflected off of Ana-Maria Crnogorčević and into goal. Crnogorčević personally credits the goal to León. Later in the month she competed in the 2020–21 Supercopa Femenina, where Barcelona lost on penalties against their rivals Atlético Madrid. León criticised the Royal Spanish Football Federation for not implementing video-assistant referreeing (VAR) in the competition, which the men's version of the competition does have.

In March 2021, she was suspended for four matches and fined €601 by the RFEF for criticising the quality of refereeing in the Primera Iberdrola after receiving a controversial red card against Real Madrid. Barcelona appealed the decision to the Administrative Tribunal of Sport (TAD), and León was able to play against second-place opponent Levante in their upcoming league match. Spain's footballing union, the Association of Spanish Footballers (AFE), issued a statement of support for León, calling the suspension an attempt to curtail her freedom of speech and expression. The following month, she made her 100th league appearance with Barcelona against UD Granadilla. León became a league champion with Barcelona for the second time on 9 May 2021.

Barcelona made it to the 2021 UEFA Women's Champions League Final after defeating Paris Saint-Germain on an aggregate score of 2–1. In the second leg of the semifinal, León's centerback partner Andrea Pereira picked up a yellow card and was suspended for the final. As expected, León played the final in a centerback pairing alongside defensive midfielder Patri Guijarro, who studied León's game to prepare herself for the match. Barcelona's defence recorded a shutout as they won 4–0, the first UEFA Women's Champions League title in club history. León was named to the 2020–21 UEFA Women's Champions League Squad of the Season, and was later listed as a nominee to the UEFA Women's Champions League Defender of the Season award. Following the conclusion of the Champions League, León played each minute of the remaining semifinal and final of the 2021 Copa de la Reina. Barcelona won the final 4–2, achieving the continental treble for the first time in their history.

León won the league title with Barcelona for the third successive season while winning every match in the process. She also won the Copa de la Reina and Supercopa de España. She started in her team's 1–3 defeat against Lyon in the Champions League final.

On 20 November 2022, she scored on her 200th appearance for Barcelona in her team's 8–0 thrashing of Alavés in a league game.

International career

León's debut with Spain's senior team came about on 15 September 2016, coming on as a substitute during Spain's UEFA Women's Euro 2017 qualifying 13–0 win against Montenegro, the second to last match of European Qualifying.

In 2017, León was called up to her first major tournament with Spain, the 2017 UEFA Women's Euro. Spain advanced to the quarterfinals of the tournament where they were defeated by Austria on penalties. León captained Spain for the first time at the 2019 Algarve Cup.

León started all of Spain's matches at the 2019 FIFA Women's World Cup as they made it to the Round of 16, where they faced the United States. In the 7th minute, she conceded a penalty after making contact with Tobin Heath in the box, which Megan Rapinoe scored to put the USA 1–0 up. The match ended 2–1 in favour of the United States as Spain exited the tournament.

In 2021, Spain played in a 3–0 win against Poland in UEFA Women's Euro 2022 qualifying, where León scored for the first time in her career with the Spain national team. The same match, she wore her mother's maiden name Cebrián on her shirt.

International goals

Style of play
León is a versatile left footed defender, possessing the ability to play as both a left-back and a center-back. She is mostly utilised as a ball-playing centerback, with her main characteristics as a player being her quality technique and passing. FIFA profiles her as an aggressive player with good reactions and reading of the game. Former Atletico Madrid manager Ángel Villacampa, who aided her transition from leftback to centerback, has described León as having the perfect connection to Barcelona’s style, with her ability to distribute the ball up the pitch and her preference for playing in a high block.

Personal life
In 2018, León came out publicly as a lesbian in an interview with Spanish newspaper El Mundo after being out for many years in her personal life. In the same interview, she spoke in disapproval of the 2018 FIFA World Cup being hosted in Russia due to anti-gay purges in Chechnya. In 2019, León was a headline speaker for the commencement of Madrid Pride. El Mundo labelled her as one of Spain's top 50 most influential LGBT people in 2018 and 2019. In 2021, she was a part of Levi's Beauty of Becoming campaign for LGBT Pride month. , she is in a relationship with Barcelona teammate and Norwegian international Ingrid Syrstad Engen.

León has a passion for motorcycles, which was influenced by her father, who is a mechanic. She also has an interest in drawing and painting, and has multiple tattoos. Her first tattoo was a small one on her foot, which she purposefully got in a discrete area to hide from her parents. One of her most prominent tattoos is that on her neck, which reads "Looks can be deceiving." She practices tattooing on her own hands and feet, and in 2021 was interning at a tattoo shop. She has stated that she'd like to focus on her tattoos and tattoo design after retiring from football.

Honours
Atletico Madrid
Primera División: 2016–17
Copa de la Reina: 2016

Barcelona
Primera División: 2019–20, 2020–21, 2021–22
UEFA Women's Champions League: 2020–21 
Copa de la Reina: 2018, 2019–20, 2020–21, 2021–22
Supercopa de España: 2019–20, 2021–22, 2022–23
Copa Catalunya: 2018, 2019

Spain
 Algarve Cup: 2017
 SheBelieves Cup: runner-up 2020
 Arnold Clark Cup: runner-up 2022

Individual
Fútbol Draft: 2013, 2015
 Primera División Best XI of the Season: 2016–17
 UEFA Women's Champions League Squad of the Season: 2020–21
 FIFA FIFPRO Women's World 11: 2022

Notes

References

External links
 
 Mapi León at FC Barcelona
 Mapi León at BDFutbol
 
 
 

1993 births
Living people
Spanish women's footballers
Footballers from Zaragoza
Primera División (women) players
Zaragoza CFF players
RCD Espanyol Femenino players
Atlético Madrid Femenino players
FC Barcelona Femení players
Spain women's international footballers
Lesbian sportswomen
Spanish LGBT sportspeople
Women's association football defenders
2019 FIFA Women's World Cup players
LGBT association football players
UEFA Women's Euro 2022 players
UEFA Women's Euro 2017 players
21st-century Spanish women